Námsflokkar Reykjavíkur is the oldest adult education institute in Iceland, established in 1939. Its current director is Iðunn Antonsdóttir.

References 

Educational institutions established in 1939
Schools in Iceland
1939 establishments in Iceland